Depanama Grama Niladhari Division is a Grama Niladhari Division of the Maharagama Divisional Secretariat of Colombo District of Western Province, Sri Lanka. It has Grama Niladhari Division Code 529A.

Depanama is a surrounded by the Pannipitiya North, Polwatta, Kalalgoda and Kottawa North Grama Niladhari Divisions.

Demographics

Ethnicity 

The Depanama Grama Niladhari Division has a Sinhalese majority (95.8). In comparison, the Maharagama Divisional Secretariat (which contains the Depanama Grama Niladhari Division) has a Sinhalese majority (95

Religion 

The Depanama Grama Niladhari Division has a Buddhist majority (93.5%). In comparison, the Maharagama Divisional Secretariat (which contains the Depanama Grama Niladhari Division) has a Buddhist majority (99.9)

References 

Grama Niladhari Divisions of Maharagama Divisional Secretariat